Flammeovirga pacifica is a bacterium from the genus of Flammeovirga which has been isolated from deep sea sediments from the West Pacific Ocean.

References

Further reading

External links
Type strain of Flammeovirga pacifica at BacDive -  the Bacterial Diversity Metadatabase	

Cytophagia
Bacteria described in 2012